Thistletown Collegiate Institute (also called Thistletown C.I., T.C.I. or Thistletown) is a public high school in Toronto, Ontario, Canada. The school is located at the corner of Fordwich Crescent and Islington Avenue in the district of Etobicoke. The motto of the school is "Scientia Crescat Vita Colatur" (Let knowledge grow so that life may be enriched). It is administered by the Toronto District School Board.

History
Thistletown's first school, made of one frame schoolhouse was opened in 1874 on the east side of Islington Av., just south of Albion Rd. It was moved eastward to Village Green in 1901. The school expanded to reflect the growth in the village. In 1947, the Etobicoke Board of Education was established and a new building was built. The school was renamed to Thistletown Middle School. 

Construction of the current school began in 1956, and its first students were admitted in September 1957 as Etobicoke's seventh secondary school. The late 1960s brought expansions to technical and vocational facilities.

Campus
Thistletown Collegiate is a white-bricked, two-story  secondary school on a 14.5 acre campus. The main entrance is located on the second level.

Athletics
In 2009, Thistletown C.I. started its football program up with a very successful season. They were crowned champions in 2015, primarily due to not letting a single touchdown occur. They won for a consecutive time in 2016.

In 2005 Thistletown C.I.'s varsity hockey team won the city championship and the year before they went undefeated all season.

Athletic triumphs include the Etobicoke senior football championship, earned in 1969 by defeating the Etobicoke H.S. Rams, led by John Villiers, Al Thomas, John Griffin. The senior basketball team reached the T.D.I.A.A. finals (consisting of all the outlying boroughs of the metropolitan area in those days, including Etobicoke, Scarborough, North York, East York, and York) in 1972 and 1975, only to suffer defeat at the hands of the George Harvey Hawks. The senior boys soccer team won the inaugural OFSAA championship in 1969, their only ever provincial championship win in soccer. Prominent contributors from that era include Edgar Jaunzarins, Steve and Ross Quakenbush, Trevor Bennett, and Ken King.

Alumni
Nav (rapper), Canadian hip hop recording artist and record producer

Gallery

See also
List of high schools in Ontario

References

External links
School website
Alumni website

Toronto District School Board
High schools in Toronto
Education in Etobicoke
Schools in the TDSB
Educational institutions established in 1957
1957 establishments in Ontario